The North Bay Trappers were a Junior "A" ice hockey team from North Bay, Ontario, Canada.  This defunct hockey team was a part of the Northern Ontario Junior Hockey Association and later the OHA Jr. "A" League after the NOJHL went on hiatus in 1972.

Season-by-season results

Playoffs
1973 DNQ
1974 Lost Semi-final
North Bay Trappers defeated Toronto Nationals 4-games-to-3
Wexford Raiders defeated North Bay Trappers 4-games-to-3
1975 Lost Quarter-final
Seneca Flyers defeated North Bay Trappers 4-games-to-2
1976 Won League, Lost OHA Buckland Cup
North Bay Trappers defeated Wexford Raiders 4-games-to-2 
North Bay Trappers defeated Markham Waxers 4-games-to-3 
North Bay Trappers defeated North York Rangers 4-games-to-3 OPJHL CHAMPIONS
Guelph CMC's (SOJHL) defeated North Bay Trappers 4-games-to-1
1977 Lost Final
North Bay Trappers defeated Aurora Tigers 4-games-to-3
North Bay Trappers defeated Markham Waxers 4-games-to-3
North York Rangers defeated North Bay Trappers 4-games-to-1
1978 Lost Semi-final
North Bay Trappers defeated North York Rangers 4-games-to-1
Guelph Platers defeated North Bay Trappers 4-games-to-2
1979 Lost Semi-final
North Bay Trappers defeated Newmarket Flyers 4-games-to-2
Dixie Beehives defeated North Bay Trappers 4-games-to-3
1980 Lost Quarter-final
Royal York Royals defeated North Bay Trappers 4-games-to-3
1981 Lost Semi-final
North Bay Trappers defeated Hamilton Mountain A's 4-games-to-3
Belleville Bulls defeated North Bay Trappers 4-games-to-none
1982 DNQ

External links
OHA Website
NOJHL Website

Defunct ice hockey teams in Canada
Ice hockey teams in Ontario
Sport in North Bay, Ontario
Ice hockey clubs established in 1962
1962 establishments in Ontario
1982 disestablishments in Ontario
Ice hockey clubs disestablished in 1982